Tsai Pi-chung is a Taiwanese politician. He took office as acting Hualien County Magistrate on 17 September 2018 until 25 December 2018. Prior to succeeding Fu Kun-chi in the position, Tsai served as Deputy Minister of Justice. He studied law at National Chengchi University and worked as a prosecutor in Penghu, Yunlin and Chiayi.

References

1958 births
Living people
National Chengchi University alumni
Government ministers of Taiwan
20th-century Taiwanese lawyers
Magistrates of Hualien County
Politicians of the Republic of China on Taiwan from Yunlin County
21st-century Taiwanese judges